Trident Seafoods is the largest seafood company in the United States, harvesting primarily wild-caught seafood in Alaska. It is a privately-held, 100% American-owned company. Trident manages a network of catcher and catcher processor vessels and processing plants across twelve coastal locations in Alaska. The company is headquartered in Seattle, Washington and has several processing plants, two shipyards, an R&D Innovation Center, and sales offices in the Lower 48 USA. The vertically integrated distributorship of its products is supported by global manufacturing and sales locations in Latin America, China, Japan, Germany, France, and the Netherlands. Trident sells frozen, canned, smoked and ready-to-eat seafood products for the wholesale, retail and food service markets under a variety of different brand names in over 55 countries. 

Many crab boats seen in the Deadliest Catch TV series are affiliated with Trident.

It is a member of the Pacific Whiting Conservation Cooperative, Alaska Seafood Marketing Institute, At-Sea Processors Association, Genuine Alaska Pollock Producers, National Fisheries Institute, Pacific Seafood Processors Association, and Seafood Nutrition Partnership

History 

The company was founded in 1973 by Chuck Bundrant. In 1986, it merged with ConAgra's Northwest Pacific seafood unit, retaining the Trident name, and with ConAgra holding a 45% stake in the new company. In 1995, ConAgra sold most of its interest to Trident's original private owners.

A leader in the consolidation of the seafood industry since the 1990s, the company has made numerous acquisitions, increasing its operations and market presence. Some of these acquisitions with their associated brands are:
 ConAgra (1986 — see above). Along with the merger came ConAgra's Sea Alaska and Lily brands.
 Farwest Fisheries (1992), along with its Faust, Prelate, Rubinstein's, Tulip, and Whitney canned seafood (primarily salmon) brands.
 Sealegs surimi brand (1999) from Nichirei Foods.
 Tyson Seafood Group (1999), along with its Arctic Ice and Pubhouse frozen seafood brands.
 NorQuest Seafoods (2004), along with its Norquest, Silver Lining and Portlock brands of frozen, canned and smoked salmon. 
 Royal, Pride and Sno Tip canned salmon brands (2004) from North Pacific Processors.
 ConAgra seafood brands (2006), including Louis Kemp (surimi) and Captain Jac.
 Bear & Wolf Salmon Co. (2008), producer of skinless and boneless canned salmon.
 Kasilof Fish Co. (2010), producer of smoked salmon products.

Key people

Joseph L. Bundrant, Chief Executive Officer
Jessica McNeil-Clapp, Executive Assistant - CEO
Bob Masching, EVP Supply Chain
Erik Anderson, EVP - General Counsel 
Stephanie Moreland, EVP - Public Affairs
John Score, Chief People Officer
Terrence Sabol, Chief Financial Officer

Exxon Valdez oil spill settlement
In 1991, Trident Seafoods and six other Seattle-based fish processors finalized a deal with Exxon over damages from the 1989 Exxon Valdez oil spill in Prince William Sound, Alaska. The agreement between Exxon and the so-called Seattle Seven came to light when Anchorage-based attorney David W. Oesting, the lead plaintiffs' counsel in Exxon Shipping Company, et al. v. Baker, Grant, et al., submitted a preliminary " 'Plan of Allocation' or Damage Matrix" to federal judge H. Russel Holland in February 1997.

The Seattle Seven responded by filing suit against Oesting and other plaintiffs' attorneys. In court it was revealed that the processors had accepted a settlement of between 63.75 and 76 million dollars from Exxon for agreeing to return to Exxon their share of any punitive damages awarded by the court. The processors "agreed to be Exxon's front" in recovering punitive damages and Exxon agreed to pay their ongoing legal fees. Judge Holland accused Exxon of acting as "Jekyll and Hyde ... behaving laudably in public and deplorably in private." Even though they had already settled with Exxon, the Seattle Seven filed $745 million in punitive damage claims to be given back to Exxon. Judge Holland voided the agreement and said that neither Exxon nor the seafood processors would share in the punitive damages.

However, in 2000, a three-judge panel of the Ninth Circuit Court of Appeals overturned Holland's decision and reinstated the agreement. The appeals court ruled that Judge Holland had abused his discretion and characterized the settlement as "an innovative way to encourage settlements in large class-action cases" that was "in the public interest."

Environmental record
In 2011, as part of a consent decree (United States of America v. Trident Seafoods Corporation, Civil Action No. 11-1616), Trident Seafoods agreed to pay $2.5 million to resolve alleged Clean Water Act violations, and to invest more than $30 million to build a fish meal plant at a Naknek salmon plant and reduce discharges at Akutan and three other plants. Dennis McLerran, then the Environmental Protection Agency (EPA) regional administrator in Seattle, called the settlement a “game changer” that would be better for the environment as well as Trident’s bottom line". In February 2019, Trident Seafoods agreed to spend up to $23 million to fix "air pollution issues with its vessels and land-based facilities." The company was fined $900,000 by the EPA for violating the Clean Air Act. 

More recently, Trident has invested in implementing Environmental Management Systems and placed significant focus on recruiting and supporting Environmental, Health and Safety experts across its global operations. The company invests heavily in the science and technologies required to advance and improve industry fishing practices for efficiency and sustainability. This includes fishing gear modification, manufacturing processes, and supporting science-based research and decisions that mitigate climate change and ensure healthy marine ecosystems.

Philanthropy 
The privately-held company does not disclose the extent of its corporate responsibility and charitable giving initiatives saying only that it focuses on the areas of Environment, Youth and Family, Hunger Relief, and Disease Prevention and Management.

However, it is known that the company has given donations to the victims of the huge earthquake that hit Japan in 2011. Groups who assisted the victims of hurricane Katrina and superstorm Sandy were also supported by Trident. The company supported Ukrainian employees during the Russia-Ukraine conflict. A Bundrant Stadium was also built in his high school alma mater in Evansville as well as a Bundrant Media Center. The company is a partner with SeaShare, donating food and meals to several food banks.

See also
SS Albert M. Boe: The final Liberty ship to be constructed, converted into a floating cannery in 1965 and is now permanently part of Trident's processing facilities in Kodiak, AK, under the name "Star of Kodiak".

References and notes

External links

 

Food and drink companies established in 1973
American companies established in 1973
1973 establishments in Washington (state)
2011 in the environment
Commercial fishing in Alaska
Food and drink companies based in Seattle
Manufacturing companies based in Seattle
ExxonMobil litigation
Exxon Valdez oil spill
Seafood companies of the United States
Water in Alaska
Fish processing companies